Microsoft InterConnect aka Microsoft Office InterConnect was a personal information manager that created Digital Business Cards with Microsoft Office Outlook contacts. Microsoft Office InterConnect was released in two versions:
 Microsoft Office InterConnect Lite (only with the 2004 version, with some features less)
 Microsoft Office InterConnect 2004 / 2007 (full version with all features)

Microsoft Office InterConnect was released first in 2004, with Microsoft Office InterConnect 2004 and Microsoft Office InterConnect Lite, and another version was released in 2007, and was a part of the 2007 Microsoft Office System. Some updates were released for this program, such as Microsoft Office InterConnect 2004 SP2 or Microsoft Office InterConnect 2007 SP3.

With the 2007 version, Microsoft Office InterConnect was released in two languages:
 Microsoft Office InterConnect 2007 Japanese (classical program, without service packs and other languages than Japanese)
 Microsoft Office InterConnect 2007 with Service Pack 3 (Japanese and English included in the CD-ROM, with classical features and SP3 preinstalled)

Microsoft Office InterConnect requires Outlook 2003 (only in Japanese for the 2004 version) / Outlook 2007 or 2010, and a POP3 email account.

On Windows XP, this software requires Oriental Languages installed.

This program was abandoned, and some of its features were included in Microsoft Office 2010.

Microsoft Office InterConnect uses the Microsoft Office Online website to get help, support and downloads.

Further reading

External links 

InterConnect